Hogg Robinson Group was a corporate travel management company. It was acquired by American Express Global Business Travel in July 2018.

History
Hogg Robinson Group was established in 1845, by brothers in law Francis Hogg, a young wine merchant, and Augustus Robinson, an insurance broker.

The partnership developed mercantile and insurance interests from offices in Birchin Lane in the City of London. Its travel business was established after World War II. By 1984, it was one of the four largest travel agency operators in the United Kingdom, and included the chains Wakefield Fortune and Blue Star, as well as the shops of Hogg Robinson.

In June 1993, the retail division was sold to Airtours (later MyTravel Group). Airtours merged it with Pickfords Travel, acquired by Airtours from Pickfords in September 1992, to form Going Places (later Thomas Cook Group). In 1997, new chairman Neville Bain led the sale of Hogg Robinson's transport division and the acquisition of two business travel operations. In June 1998, it acquired 51% of Hider Travel of Canada.

In June 2000, chief executive David Radcliffe led a £232 million management buyout funded by Schroder Ventures (now Permira). Hogg Robinson divested of various of its insurance broking businesses in 2001.

In October 2006, the company expanded in Halifax, Nova Scotia. In April 2007, the company expanded its office space in Charlotte, North Carolina. In March 2012, the company acquired Spendvision. In February 2015, it was rebranded as Fraedom.

In May 2017, the company acquired eWings.com, a travel management company for small to medium sized companies. In February 2018, the company sold Fraedom to Visa Inc. for $195 million. On July 19, 2018, American Express Global Business Travel acquired the company for approximately £400 million.

References

British companies disestablished in 2018
Companies formerly listed on the London Stock Exchange
British companies established in 1845